NMC may refer to: 
 NMC Health
 NMC Recordings, a record label and music company in the United Kingdom
 NMC Records, an Israeli record label and music company
 NUT midline carcinoma, a cancer
 Nagpur Municipal Corporation, Nagpur, India
 Namecoin, a cryptocurrency code
 National Hurricane Center radio station callsign, California, US
 National Media Council (disambiguation), government agencies for media
 National Medical Commission, in India
 National Motors Corporation, a fictional US automobile manufacturer
 National Music Centre, Calgary, Alberta, Canada
 National Music Conservatory, Amman, Jordan
 Negombo Municipal Council, the local council for Negombo, Sri Lanka
 Nehru Memorial College, Sullia, Sullia, Karnataka, India
 Neo-Mitochondrial Creatures, mutants from the Parasite Eve games
 Nepal Medical Council
 New Media Consortium
 New Method College, a defunct secondary school in Hong Kong
 News Media Coalition, of international news organisations, for press freedom
 New Muon Collaboration, a particle physics collaboration who carried out the NA37 experiment
 Ngam language, ISO 639
 Lithium nickel manganese cobalt oxide, a type of lithium-ion battery technology
 Nishtar Medical College in Multan, Punjab, Pakistan
 Nissan, a Japanese motor company
 Nordic Mathematical Contest for secondary school students
 Northern Marianas College, US Mariana Islands
 Northwestern Michigan College, Traverse City, US
 Nuclear Management Company
 Nuclear Measurements Corporation, a maker of radiation measuring and monitoring devices
 Nursing and Midwifery Council, UK regulator